Peter Craig (born November 10, 1969) is an American novelist, screenwriter and actor. He is best known for co-writing the screenplays to The Town (2010), The Batman, and Top Gun: Maverick (both 2022), earning an Academy Award nomination for the lattermost.

Early life
Craig grew up in Southern California and Oregon. He is one of two children of Steve Craig and actress Sally Field, since divorced. Craig's brother, Eli Craig, is a film director. Peter Craig attended the Iowa Writers' Workshop at the University of Iowa and studied under authors Tobias Wolff and Marilynne Robinson.

Career
As a novelist, Craig has written The Martini Shot, Hot Plastic, and Blood Father.

As a screenwriter, Craig debuted with The Town (2010), based on the novel Prince of Thieves by Chuck Hogan, co-writing it with Ben Affleck and Aaron Stockard. He then adapted the screenplays for The Hunger Games: Mockingjay – Part 1 and Part 2 with Danny Strong. In 2016, Craig adapted his own novel, Blood Father, into a film of the same name directed by Jean-François Richet, and then adapted the novel Horse Soldiers, Doug Stanton's nonfiction account of the war in Afghanistan, into the film 12 Strong (2018). In 2021, he wrote the sequel Bad Boys for Life, with Chris Bremner and Joe Carnahan.

In 2022, Craig co-wrote the screenplay Top Gun: Maverick with Justin Marks, Christopher McQuarrie, Ehren Kruger, and Eric Warren Singer, which earned him a nomination for the Academy Award for Best Adapted Screenplay. That same year he co-wrote the screenplay for The Batman with director Matt Reeves. 

Craig also co-wrote the screenplay for The Mother with Andrea Berloff and Misha Green. Directed by Niki Caro, that film is scheduled for release on Netflix on May 12, 2023.<ref name="Hollywood North Buzz"/ Craig has been nominated for two Writers Guild of America Awards and a Critics' Choice Movie Award for Best Adapted Screenplay. At the worldwide box office, he is among the 25 highest-grossing screenwriters of all-time.

Personal life
Craig has been married and divorced twice: first to Amy Scattergood, the Los Angeles Times food writer, and then to actress Jennifer DeFrancisco. He has two daughters with Scattergood, and a son with DeFrancisco. He is currently engaged to Cristina Esposito, a teacher and PhD candidate.

Filmography
Feature films

Television

Acting credits

Novels
 The Martini Shot (William Morrow, 1998)
 Hot Plastic (Hyperion, 2004); (Hachette Book Group USA, 2015)
 Blood Father (Hyperion, 2005); (Hachette Book Group USA, 2015)

References

External links
 

1969 births
20th-century American novelists
American male film actors
American male television actors
American male voice actors
Writers from Los Angeles
Writers from Portland, Oregon
Iowa Writers' Workshop alumni
Living people
Male actors from Los Angeles
21st-century American novelists
American male novelists
20th-century American male actors
20th-century American male writers
21st-century American male actors
21st-century American male writers
Novelists from Oregon
University of Iowa alumni